Jaton sinespina is a species of sea snail, a marine gastropod mollusk  family Muricidae, the murex snails or rock snails.

Description

Distribution

References

 Nolf F. & Hubrecht S. (2020). A comparative study of the Jaton species in East Atlantic waters. Neptunea. 15(2): 11–36.

External links
 MNHN, Paris: holotype
 Vermeij, G. J.; Houart, R. (1996). The genus Jaton (Muricidae, Ocenebrinae), with the description of a new species from Angola, West Africa. Iberus. 14(1): 83-91

Ocenebrinae
Gastropods described in 1996